Stojković is a Serbian surname, derived from the male given name Stojko, a diminutive of Stojan. It may refer to:

Benedikt Stojković (1714–1801), Roman Catholic clergyman
Danilo "Bata" Stojković, stage and film actor
Dennis Stojković, Serbian footballer
Dragan "Piksi" Stojković, retired footballer, former manager of J. League side Nagoya Grampus
Filip Stojković, Montenegrin football player
Milenko Stojković, leading figures in the First Serbian Uprising
Miodrag Stojković, genetics researcher
Nenad Stojković, Serbian defender who played at FIFA World Cup 1982 for SFR Yugoslavia
Vladimir Stojković, football goalkeeper, currently on loan at FK Partizan
Zoran Stojković, court judge and politician, current Serbian Minister of Justice
Rastko Stojković, handball player, currently playing for the Polish team Vive Targi Kielce

See also
Stojanović, a surname
Stojačić, a surname
Stojaković, a surname
Stojmenović, a surname

Serbian surnames